Västervik is a city and the seat of Västervik Municipality, Kalmar County, Sweden, with 36,747 inhabitants in 2021. Västervik is one of three coastal towns with a notable population size in the province of Småland.

Climate 

Västervik has a semi-continental type of the oceanic climate (Cfb) using the -3°C isotherm, and a true humid continental climate (Dfb) using the 0°C isotherm, with vast differences between seasons. Differences are likely to be minor, with precipitation normals being available in greater detail for Västervik's station. Overnight lows may be the biggest difference, due Västervik's coastal position.

Economy  

The city still bases much of its industry on its harbour, and on the industries that were established as a result of it in the late 19th century. Västervik has suffered the closure of certain factories, notably Electrolux, with associated job losses. Just outside Västervik, there is the static inverter of HVDC Gotland and Fårhultsmasten, a 335 m tall guyed mast used for FM/TV-transmission, which shares with three other masts the title of Sweden's tallest structure.

Culture
Every year since 1966 there is a folk music festival in Västervik, at the ruins of the Stegeholm castle.  The area has artistic talent by artists, potters, craft people and painters.

Recreation

Being a summer town popular with yachtspeople, campers, daytrippers, and returning former residents, Västervik experiences an annual revival in July.

Västervik offers an outdoor life of climbing, canoeing and sailing or islands to visit and stay at. Björn Ulvaeus, a member of the internationally successful pop group ABBA who grew up in Västervik, is building a complex consisting of hotel, restaurant, and apartments in the bay near Stegeholm castle, which will be a tourist attraction for Västervik.

Other uses 
Västervik is also the name of a small village 8 km north of Vaasa, Finland. The name just means "western bay", so there could be more minor localities by that name.

People
Ellen Key, author and feminist
Gottfrid Emanuel Lundberg,  Swedish-American engraver
Björn Ulvaeus, one of the four members of the pop group ABBA
Alice Babs, singer
John F. Carlson, Swedish-born American Impressionist artist
Stefan Edberg, tennis player
Ulf Grenander, statistician, probabilist, and computer scientist.
Gösta Bernhard, actor and film director
Magnus Härenstam, comedian, actor and TV host
Hansi Schwarz, musician and band member of Hootenanny Singers. Manager of the annual music festival in Västervik
Ola Källenius, Chairman of the Board of Management of Daimler AG, and head of Mercedes-Benz Cars in Stuttgart, Germany

See also 

 Västerviks gymnasium
 Västervik Speedway, motorcycle speedway club

References 

 
Populated places in Kalmar County
Coastal cities and towns in Sweden
Populated places in Västervik Municipality
Municipal seats of Kalmar County
Swedish municipal seats

fi:Västervikin kunta